Harvie S (born Harvie Swartz; December 6, 1948) is an American jazz double-bassist.

He learned piano as a child and did not begin playing bass until 1967, when he was nineteen years old. He attended Berklee College of Music and played in and around Boston with Al Cohn, Zoot Sims, Mose Allison, and Chris Connor. He moved to New York City in 1972, where he worked with Jackie Paris, Thad Jones, Gil Evans, Lee Konitz, Barry Miles (1974–76), David Friedman, Double Image, David Matthews, Steve Kuhn (1977–1981) and Paul Motian. He has recorded extensively as a duet with Sheila Jordan, and has released numerous albums as the leader of his own ensembles, including Urban Earth and the Harvie S Band. Harvie S has recorded, performed and produced music exclusively as Harvie S since 2001. In 2008, he released a duo album with pianist Kenny Barron, Now Was the Time, on HighNote/Savant Records. He has been a member of the Westchester Jazz Orchestra since 2007.

Discography

As leader
 Underneath it All (Gramavision, 1980)
 That Old Time Feeling (1982, Palo Alto, with Sheila Jordan)
 Urban Earth (Gramavision, 1985) U.S. Top Jazz Albums No. 24
 Smart Moves (Gramavision, 1986)
 It's About Time (Gaia, 1988)
 Full Moon Dancer (Blue Moon, 1989)
 In a Different Light (Blue Moon, 1990)
 Arrival (Novus, 1991)
 Havana Mañana (Bembe, 1999)
 New Beginning (RVS)
 Texas Rumba (Zoho Music)
 Funky Cha (Zoho Music)
 Now Was the Time (Savant) with Kenny Barron
 Too Late Now (Ward)
 Yesterdays (Savant)

As co-leader
With Sheryl Bailey
Plucky Strum (Whaling City Sound, 2015)
Plucky Strum Departure (Whaling City Sound, 2017)

As Sideman

With Alan Broadbent
Developing Story (2017)
New York Notes (2018)

With Sinan AlimanovićLejla (2020)
With Art FarmerSomething You Got (CTI, 1977)

With Urbie GreenSeñor Blues (CTI, 1977)

With Jackie and RoyA Wilder Alias (CTI, 1973)

With Eric KlossBodies' Warmth (Muse, 1974)

With Steve KuhnMotility (ECM, 1977)Non-Fiction (ECM, 1978)Playground with Sheila Jordan (ECM, 1979)Last Year's Waltz (ECM, 1980)

With Anders MogensenLive! on March 16th at Jazzhus Dexter (Blackout Music, 2002)

With Roseanna VitroReaching for the Moon'' (Chase Music Group, 1991)

References

External links

New England Jazz History Database: Joe Zupan Interview with Harvie S

1948 births
Living people
American jazz double-bassists
Male double-bassists
Jazz musicians from Massachusetts
Berklee College of Music alumni
21st-century double-bassists
21st-century American male musicians
American male jazz musicians
Westchester Jazz Orchestra members
Zoho Music artists
Gramavision Records artists
Palo Alto Records artists
HighNote Records artists
Novus Records artists